Manchester Gorton is a constituency represented in the House of Commons of the UK Parliament by Labour's Afzal Khan, who was elected at the 2017 general election. It is the safest Labour seat in Greater Manchester by numerical majority and one of the safest in the country.

Constituency profile
The seat covers Gorton, Fallowfield, Levenshulme, Longsight, Rusholme and Whalley Range to the south and east of the city centre, which are diverse and liberal suburbs, with some levels of deprivation such as in Longsight. Most housing is made of red brick terraced houses. There is a large student population, particularly in Fallowfield which includes several halls of residence and private rented houses serving students of Manchester's large universities, though the universities’ campuses are in Manchester Central. The seat includes the Curry Mile of takeaways and restaurants, Gorton Monastery, and small urban parks such as Debdale Park and Platt Fields Park.

The seat is ethnically diverse and its residents are less wealthy than the UK average.

History
The Redistribution of Seats Act 1885 divided the existing seat of South East Lancashire into eight single-member constituencies, an Act which significantly increased representation across Britain.

Manchester Gorton has returned MPs from the Labour Party since 1935, with majorities exceeding 17% since 1979. The 2015 general election result made the seat the eighth-safest of Labour's 232 seats by percentage of majority.

From 1983 to 2017, Sir Gerald Kaufman, Father of the House of Commons, represented the constituency. His death in February 2017 triggered a by-election which was due to be held on 4 May 2017, but this was subsequently countermanded (that is, cancelled) after the House of Commons voted for a snap general election to be held on 8 June 2017. At that election, the Conservatives returned their lowest vote share for any seat in Great Britain, at 7.3%.

Boundaries

1885–1918: The Gorton Division of the parliamentary county of South East Lancashire was defined as consisting of the parishes of Denton, Haughton, and Openshaw, and the parish of Gorton (except for the detached part in the parliamentary borough of Manchester).

The constituency comprised an area bounded on the west by the city of Manchester and to the east and south by the county boundary with Cheshire.
 
In 1890, Manchester's municipal boundaries were extended to include Gorton and Openshaw, although constituency boundaries remained unchanged until 1918. Prior to 1918 the constituency consisted of four wards: Gorton North, Gorton South, Openshaw and St. Mark's.

1918–1950: The Gorton division of the parliamentary borough of Manchester was defined as consisting of the Gorton North, Gorton South and Openshaw wards of the county borough of Manchester.

The Representation of the People Act 1918 reorganised parliamentary seats throughout Great Britain. The redistribution reflected the boundary changes of 1890, with Gorton becoming a division of the parliamentary borough of Manchester. Denton and Haughton, which together had formed Denton Urban District in 1894, were transferred to the Mossley Division of Lancashire.

1950–1955: The borough constituency of Manchester, Gorton was defined as consisting of the Gorton North, Gorton South, Levenshulme and Openshaw wards of the county borough of Manchester.

The next redrawing of English constituencies was effected by the Representation of the People Act 1948. The Act introduced the term "borough constituency". Levenshulme was transferred from the abolished Manchester Rusholme seat. The revised boundaries were first used at the 1950 general election.

1955–1974: The Gorton North and Gorton South wards of the county borough of Manchester, and the urban districts of Audenshaw and Denton.

In 1955 boundary changes were made based on the recommendations of the Boundary Commission appointed under the House of Commons (Redistribution of Seats) Act 1949. Levenshulme passed to Manchester Withington while Openshaw formed the core of a new Manchester Openshaw seat.

1974–1983: The Gorton North and Gorton South wards of the county borough of Manchester, and the urban districts of Audenshaw and Denton.

The Boundary Commission for England proposed no change to the constituency at the Second Periodic Review of Westminster constituencies, but later went on to propose a minor amendment to the constituency to meet new ward boundaries in Manchester.

1983–2010: The Fallowfield, Gorton North, Gorton South, Levenshulme, Longsight and Rusholme wards of the City of Manchester.

The 1983 redistribution of seats reflected local government reforms made in 1974. Manchester Gorton became a borough constituency in the parliamentary county of Greater Manchester. The constituency was unaltered at the next redistribution prior to the 1997 general election.

2010–: The Fallowfield, Gorton North, Gorton South, Levenshulme, Longsight, Rusholme and Whalley Range wards of the City of Manchester.

In 2018 the Local Government Boundary Commission for England (LGBCE) implemented changes to Manchester's electoral wards including the merging of Gorton North and Gorton South to create a new ward, Gorton and Abbey Hey. For the purposes of parliamentary elections the 2004-2018 ward boundaries are used.

Members of Parliament

Elections

Elections in the 2010s

These are the same as the candidates who were to stand at the cancelled 2017 by-election, except for an Official Monster Raving Loony Party candidate and another independent, who did not stand at the general election.

Elections in the 2000s

Elections in the 1990s 
Changes in vote compared with notional figures for 1992 election following boundary changes.

Elections in the 1980s 

Gerald Kaufman had been the MP for the Manchester Ardwick constituency, which had been abolished for this election, since 1970.

Elections in the 1970s

Elections in the 1960s

Elections in the 1950s

Elections in the 1940s

Elections in the 1930s

Elections in the 1920s

Election in 1918

Although Hodge was a member of the Coalition Government, no official Coalition Government endorsement was sent to any candidate

Election results for South-East Lancashire, Gorton Division

Elections in the 1910s 
Expected General Election 1914–15:
Under the terms of the Parliament Act 1911 a General Election was required to take place before the end of 1915. The political parties had been making preparations for an election to take place and by July 1914, the following candidates had been selected; 
Labour: John Hodge
Unionist: Fred H Carter
In the event, the election was postponed on the outbreak of the Great War.

Elections in the 1900s 

Mr Hatch crossed the floor of the House of Commons to sit with the Liberals, around February 1905.

Elections in the 1890s

Elections in the 1880s 

 

 Caused by Peacock's death.

See also
 List of parliamentary constituencies in Greater Manchester

Notes

References

Gorton
Constituencies of the Parliament of the United Kingdom established in 1885